Santa Rita do Novo Destino is a municipality in northeastern Goiás state, Brazil.

Location

Santa Rita do Novo Destino is 82 km. east of Ceres and  15 km. north of Goianésia. Highway connections from Goiânia are made by taking  GO-080 / Nerópolis / São Francisco de Goiás / BR-153 / Jaraguá / GO-080 / Goianésia / GO-438.  Seplan

Neighboring municipalities:  Hidrolina, São Luíz do Norte, Barro Alto, and Santa Isabel

Demographics

Urban population: 1,156
Population density: 3.53 inhabitants/km2 (2007)
Population growth rate: 1.56% 2000/2007

The Economy

The economy is based on subsistence agriculture, cattle raising, services, public administration, and small transformation industries.  
In 2006 there were 476 farms with a total area of 70,126 hectares.  Of this pasture land made up 48,000 hectares.  There were 48,000 head of cattle.  The main crops were rice, sugarcane (2,450 hectares), manioc, corn (1,000 hectares), and soybeans (1,500 hectares).

Health and Education

The adult literacy rate was 78.8% (2000) (national average was 86.4%) and the infant mortality rate was 33.10 (2000) (national average was 33.0).  In 2007 there were no hospitals and there were 5 schools.

Human Development Index:   0.684
State ranking:  221 (out of 242 municipalities)
National ranking:  3,246 (out of 5,507 municipalities)

For the complete list see frigoletto.com.br

See also
List of municipalities in Goiás

References

Frigoletto
 Sepin

Municipalities in Goiás